Phendula is the second studio album by South African singer Zahara. It was released by TS Records on September 13, 2013. The album's production was primarily handled by Robbie Malinga and Mojalefa Thebe. It features guest appearances from Ladysmith Black Mambazo, Anele & Neliswa, Mzwakhe Mbuli, Mukengerwa Tresor Riziki and 2 Face Idibia. It was supported by three singles: "Phendula", "Impilo" and "Stay". Upon its release, the album was made available for purchase on iTunes and Musica.

Background, recording, and upcoming release
In an interview with Yoliswa Sobuwa of The Herald, Zahara was asked to describe the album. She said, "I am so excited about this album. My fans will love it as I've grown a lot vocally and also in my writing skills". Moreover, she elaborated on the album's lead single "Phendula", saying, "My single Phendula talks about seeking answers from God. A lot is happening from people being victims of crime. There's a lot of poverty and unemployment. All I am saying is that God should answer our prayers." In the above-mentioned interview, Thembinkosi "TK" Nciza of TS Records said, "All 14 songs on the album will become popular. People will be touched, as Zahara writes from the bottom of her heart and she motivates people...She has upped her standards and with this album she has featured Mzwakhe Mbuli, Nigerian artist 2face Idibia, and Anele and Neliswa Mxhakaza, the Idols twins. Her music is for all Africans and this is one of the greatest albums ever to be produced in South Africa."

The album was recorded at KZN Studios in Greyville, Durban; it was mastered at TS Records studios in Joburg. In an interview with You magazine, Zahara said she's planning on shooting a live DVD for Phendula and plans on inviting everyone she featured on the album. TruFm reported that the album went platinum after being on the market for 7 days. Furthermore, it went double platinum and sold over 100,000 copies after 2 weeks.

Singles
On September 6, 2013, "Phendula" was released as the album's lead single. Its music video was uploaded onto YouTube on September 27, 2013.

"Impilo" was released on November 1, 2013, as the second single from the album. The music video for the song features cameo appearances from TS Records dignitaries; it was uploaded onto YouTube at a total length of 3 minutes and 48 seconds. A writer for Music Industry Online commented on the music video, saying, "Like many of her songs, Zahara is seen on the video playing her guitar with some shots showing her boss, DJ Sbu enjoying the music. Already people are praising the music video, labelling it 'Great work'."

The album's third single "Stay" features vocals from Nigerian singer 2 Face Idibia. In an interview with Sunday Sun newspaper, Zahara described the song as a melodic song about love. Zahara and 2face recorded the song after being in the studio for 5 hours.

The Phendula tour 

To celebrate the successful release of the album, Zahara and her management team put together the Phendula Tour, which was sponsored by Nedbank and supported by Drum Magazine, Cape Argus, Vukani and Metro FM.

Critical reception
Phendula received positive reviews from music critics. A writer for Swagger Magazine gave the album a 91.8 rating, adding, "Most of the songs on the album are quite good regardless of how they’re arranged. There are also songs that while easy on the ears, are deeper and more thoughtful than typical pop. The intensity of her interest in the subtle shades of truth informs her singularly refined lyrics. Combined with her exquisite musicianship and the sultry quality of her voice, she immerses you in a world that is both cerebral and sensual."

Accolades
Phendula was nominated for Best African Pop Album at the 2014 Metro FM Music Awards. It won Best Selling Album and Best RnB, Soul and Reggae at the 20th Annual SAMAs.

Track listing

Personnel

Bulelwa Mkutukana – primary artist, writer
 Ladysmith Black Mambazo – featured artists, writers 
 Anele & Neliswa – featured artist 
 Mzwakhe Mbuli – featured artist
 Mukengerwa Tresor Riziki – featured artist
Robbie Malinga – producer
Mojalefa Thebe – producer

Release history

References

2013 albums
Xhosa-language albums
Zahara (South African musician) albums